Jie Tang (born 1977) is a full-time professor at the Department of Computer Science of Tsinghua University. He received a PhD in computer science from the same university in 2006. He is known for building the academic social network search system ArnetMiner, which was launched in March 2006 and now has attracted 2,766,356 independent IP accesses from 220 countries.
His research interests include social networks and data mining.

He was elevated to IEEE Fellow in 2021 "for contributions to knowledge discovery from data and social network mining".
He was elevated to ACM Fellow in 2022 "for contributions to information and social network mining".

References

External links
 AMiner.org
 Homepage

Living people
Academic staff of Tsinghua University
Data miners
Fellow Members of the IEEE
Fellows of the Association for Computing Machinery
Tsinghua University alumni
Tsinghua University people
Computer scientists
1977 births